Ann Parker is a writer, and was a finalist for Best Historical Novel in the 2011 Agatha Award. She studied at the University of California, Berkeley.

Works

Silver Rush Series 
 Silver Lies (2003)
 Iron Ties (2006)
 Leaden Skies (2009)
 Mercury's Rise (2011)
 What Gold Buys (2016)
 A Dying Note (2018)
 Mortal Music (2020)
 The Secret in the Wall (2022)

References

Year of birth missing (living people)
Living people
American historical novelists
University of California, Berkeley alumni
Place of birth missing (living people)
American women writers
Women historical novelists
21st-century American women writers